Rice County Courthouse may refer to:

Rice County Courthouse (Kansas), Lyons, Kansas
Rice County Courthouse and Jail, Faribault, Minnesota